Dionychastrum is a monotypic genus of flowering plants belonging to the family Melastomataceae. The only species is Dionychastrum schliebenii.

Its native range is Tanzania.

References

Melastomataceae
Melastomataceae genera
Monotypic Myrtales genera